Semimytilus is a genus in the family Mytilidae. The genus is also connected with freshwater habitats.

Species
Species in this genus include:
Semimytilus algosus
Semimytilus pseudocapensis

References 

Mytilidae
Molluscs